The 1952 New York Yankees season was the 50th season for the Yankees. The team finished with a record of 95–59, winning their 19th pennant, finishing 2 games ahead of the Cleveland Indians. New York was managed by Casey Stengel. The Yankees played their home games at Yankee Stadium. In the World Series, they defeated the Brooklyn Dodgers in 7 games. This was their fourth consecutive World Series win, tying the record they had set during 1936–1939. It was also the first season that the Yankees aired their games exclusively on WPIX-TV, an arrangement which would last until the end of the 1998 season. The channel was also the home of the baseball Giants broadcasts from 1949, thus it was the first time ever that the channel had broadcast both the AL and NL baseball teams from the city. In 2016, when WPIX resumed FTA broadcasts of Yankees games in association with the current cable broadcaster YES Network, the channel returned to being the sole FTA broadcaster for the city's MLB franchises, as it is also currently the FTA broadcaster for the New York Mets.

Offseason
 December 3, 1951: Rubén Gómez was drafted by the Yankees from the St. Jean Canadians in the 1951 minor league draft.
 December 11, 1951: Joe DiMaggio retires from playing.

Regular season

Season standings

Record vs. opponents

Notable transactions
 June 1952: Rubén Gómez was released by the Yankees.
 August 28, 1952: Jim Greengrass, Bob Marquis, Ernie Nevel, Johnny Schmitz and $35,000 were traded by the Yankees to the Cincinnati Reds for Ewell Blackwell.

Roster

Player stats

Batting

Starters by position
Note: Pos = Position; G = Games played; AB = At bats; H = Hits; Avg. = Batting average; HR = Home runs; RBI = Runs batted in

Other batters
Note: G = Games played; AB = At bats; H = Hits; Avg. = Batting average; HR = Home runs; RBI = Runs batted in

Pitching

Starting pitchers
Note: G = Games pitched; IP = Innings pitched; W = Wins; L = Losses; ERA = Earned run average; SO = Strikeouts

Other pitchers
Note: G = Games pitched; IP = Innings pitched; W = Wins; L = Losses; ERA = Earned run average; SO = Strikeouts

Relief pitchers
Note: G = Games pitched; W = Wins; L = Losses; SV = Saves; ERA = Earned run average; SO = Strikeouts

World series

AL New York Yankees (4) vs. NL Brooklyn Dodgers (3)

Awards and honors
 Johnny Mize, Babe Ruth Award
All-Star Game

Farm system

LEAGUE CHAMPIONS: Kansas City, Binghamton, Joplin, McAlester

Notes

References
1952 New York Yankees at Baseball Reference
1952 World Series
1952 New York Yankees team page at www.baseball-almanac.com

New York Yankees seasons
New York Yankees
New York Yankees
1950s in the Bronx
American League champion seasons
World Series champion seasons